Valley Falls may refer to a place in the United States:

 Valley Falls, Kansas
 Valley Falls, New York
 Valley Falls, Oregon
 Valley Falls, Rhode Island
 Valley Falls, South Carolina
 Valley Falls State Park located in West Virginia